Alut may refer to:
Alut District, an administrative subdivision of Iran
Alut, Namshir, a village in Iran
 Ilut, a place in Israel